Kyle Langford (born 1 December 1996) is a professional Australian rules footballer with the Essendon Football Club in the Australian Football League (AFL). He was recruited by the Essendon Football Club with the 17th overall selection in the 2014 national draft.

Langford attended Ivanhoe Grammar School, and represented both the Northern Knights and Vic Metro in the TAC Cup and AFL Under 18 Championships respectively. He kicked back-to-back five-goal hauls and equaled the highest marking average of eight marks per match in the TAC Cup. He made his AFL debut against St Kilda in round 5, 2015.

He played 17 games in the 2016 AFL season, spending most of his time in the midfield and across the half-forward line. Langford booted 12 goals for the season (4th overall at the club) including three in the Bombers win over Carlton in round 23.

Langford received the No.4 guernsey for the 2018 AFL season, previously held by club champion Jobe Watson. He took the next step in his development, showing plenty of skill and composure while playing in his new midfield role, while also being able to rest forward and contribute on the scoreboard.

In the 2019 Regular Season Langford played 17 of 22 games in a forward/midfield role.

The 2020 season saw Langford achieve his most consistent season to date. He played 16 of a possible 17 games, finished 4th in the club's Best and Fairest and 3rd in the club's goal kicking.

Statistics
Statistics are correct to the end 2020

|-
! scope="row" style="text-align:center" | 2015
|  || 30 || 8 || 3 || 3 || 27 || 37 || 64 || 15 || 19 || 0.4 || 0.4 || 3.4 || 4.6 || 8.0 || 1.9 || 2.4
|- style="background-color: #EAEAEA"
! scope="row" style="text-align:center" | 2016
|  || 30 || 17 || 12 || 7 || 134 || 126 || 260 || 81 || 58 || 0.7 || 0.4 || 7.9 || 7.4 || 15.3 || 4.8 || 3.4
|-
! scope="row" style="text-align:center" | 2017
|  || 30 || 6 || 4 || 4 || 47 || 35 || 82 || 26 || 19 || 0.7 || 0.7 || 7.8 || 5.8 || 13.7 || 4.3 || 3.2
|- style="background-color: #EAEAEA"
! scope="row" style="text-align:center" | 2018
|  || 4 || 16 || 9 || 8 || 168 || 119 || 287 || 64 || 78 || 0.6 || 0.5 || 10.5 || 7.4 || 17.9 || 4.0 || 4.9
|-
! scope="row" style="text-align:center" | 2019
|  || 4 || 17 || 15 || 3 || 153 || 146 || 299 || 60 || 56 || 0.9 || 0.2 || 9.0 || 8.6 || 17.6 || 3.5 || 3.3
|- style="background-color: #EAEAEA"
! scope="row" style="text-align:center" | 2020
|  || 4 || 16 || 11 || 9 || 146 || 142 || 288 || 65 || 30 || 0.7 || 0.6 || 9.1 || 8.9 || 18.0 || 4.1 || 1.9
|- class="sortbottom"
! colspan=3| Career
! 81
! 54
! 34
! 684
! 612
! 1296
! 315
! 260
! 0.7
! 0.4
! 8.4
! 7.7
! 16.0
! 3.9
! 3.2
|}

References

External links

1996 births
Living people
Essendon Football Club players
Australian rules footballers from Victoria (Australia)
Northern Knights players
Australian people of American descent
People educated at Ivanhoe Grammar School